Marcel de Jong (born 15 October 1986) is a Canadian former professional soccer player who played as a left-back.

Club career

Early career
De Jong played for amateur side De Valk and joined the PSV Eindhoven youth academy in 1996. He started his professional career with Dutch Eerste Divisie side Helmond Sport and joined Roda JC in the summer of 2006.

FC Augsburg

After four years with Roda JC, de Jong signed with German club FC Augsburg on 21 May 2010. Marcel scored his first goal for the second division German side on 12 September 2010 versus VfL Bochum at the Ruhrstadion. They won this away fixture 2–0 in which de Jong also assisted the other goal from teammate Michael Thurk. De Jong scored his second goal of the season several months later on 4 February 2011 in a 2–0 away win versus VfL Osnabrück. De Jong in his first season with Augsburg started 24 league games and helped take the team to finish second in 2. Bundesliga securing automatic promotion to top flight football, finishing several points behind Hertha BSC.

De Jong made his Bundesliga debut in the first game of the 2011–12 season on 6 August 2011 against SC Freiburg; the game ended in a 2–2 home draw.  On 4 October 2011, Marcel de Jong suffered a knee injury that would keep him out of action for two months.  He returned to action as an unused substitute on 4 December 2011 during a 3–1 defeat to Schalke 04. De Jong made his full return to the team the following week against Borussia Mönchengladbach; starting the game, he helped earn the team only their third victory of the campaign, winning 1–0. De Jong scored his first Bundesliga goal on 28 January 2012 against 1. FC Kaiserslautern, the game ended in a 2–2 home draw. De Jong sustained an ankle injury in an early February draw against 1. FC Nürnberg, forcing him to have season-ending surgery on the ligaments.

De Jong made his return from his injury 1 September 2012 in a 3–1 defeat to Schalke 04. He scored his first goal of the season on 27 April 2013 against VfB Stuttgart in a 3–0 victory, de Jong came on as a sub and scored a minute after coming on. Unsatisfied with his role as a reserve in the 2014–15 season, De Jong and Augsburg agreed to terminate his contract in January 2015.

Sporting Kansas City
After an extended trial, de Jong signed with Sporting Kansas City ahead of the 2015 MLS season. He made his debut against FC Dallas on 14 March. On 1 March 2016, Sporting KC announced the club had terminated its contract with De Jong by mutual consent.

Ottawa Fury
The day after being released by Sporting KC, de Jong signed with NASL club Ottawa Fury, joining fellow Canadian international teammate Julian de Guzman.

After a good Spring season with Ottawa, de Jong had stated in interviews that he and his family "liked it here" (in Ottawa) and that he wanted to stay despite interest from multiple other clubs. However, when questioned by media, Fury manager Paul Dalglish stated that he was doubtful that the club would be able to afford de Jong. On 22 June 2016, Dalglish stated that he had made de Jong "his best possible offer" and that it was up to the player as to whether or not he would accept it and stay in Ottawa or sign elsewhere. On 30 June, the club stated in a preview for its Fall season opener that de Jong had not been re-signed.

Vancouver Whitecaps FC
On 11 July, Vancouver Whitecaps FC announced they had signed de Jong via Twitter.

On 4 February 2019, de Jong and Vancouver mutually agreed to terminate his contract with the club.

Pacific FC
On 19 February 2019, de Jong signed with Canadian Premier League club Pacific FC. The next month on 15 March, Pacific FC revealed de Jong suffered a ruptured Achilles tendon in training, sidelining him for the season. It was expected that de Jong would miss the entire 2019 Canadian Premier League season, but when the season was almost over, he was able to make his debut in the 66th minute of a 1–1 draw against the HFX Wanderers. De Jong re-signed with Pacific in October 2020 for the 2021 season.

On 5 March 2021, de Jong announced his retirement from football.

International career
In the summer of 2005, De Jong played for the U-20 Canadian national team at the 2005 FIFA World Youth Championship in the Netherlands. On 26 September 2007, just before his 21st birthday, De Jong decided to play for the Canadian national team instead of the Netherlands, reasoning that he would be more likely to earn a regular place in the Canada team than with the Netherlands.

He made his senior debut for Canada in a November 2007 friendly match against South Africa. De Jong scored his first goal for Canada in a 2–2 draw against Costa Rica on 10 July 2009. De Jong was selected for his second consecutive Gold Cup in May 2011, Canada failed to exit the group stage with a 1–1–1 record.

Personal life
Born in Canada to Dutch parents, De Jong moved to the Netherlands at the age of five and did not return to Canada until he was selected by the Canada U17 national soccer team in 2003.

Career statistics

Club

International

Scores and results list Canada's goal tally first, score column indicates score after each de Jong goal.

Honours

Club 
FC Augsburg
 2. Bundesliga Runner-up (Promotion to the Bundesliga): 2010–11

Sporting Kansas City
 Lamar Hunt U.S. Open Cup winner : 2015

References

External links
 
 
 
 Dutch league stats – Voetbal International 

1986 births
Living people
Association football defenders
Canadian soccer players
Soccer people from Ontario
Sportspeople from Newmarket, Ontario
Canadian people of Dutch descent
Canadian expatriate soccer players
Expatriate footballers in Germany
Canadian expatriate sportspeople in Germany
Expatriate soccer players in the United States
Canadian expatriate sportspeople in the United States
PSV Eindhoven players
Helmond Sport players
Roda JC Kerkrade players
FC Augsburg players
Sporting Kansas City players
Ottawa Fury FC players
Vancouver Whitecaps FC players
Pacific FC players
Eerste Divisie players
Eredivisie players
2. Bundesliga players
Bundesliga players
Major League Soccer players
North American Soccer League players
Canadian Premier League players
Canada men's youth international soccer players
Canada men's international soccer players
2009 CONCACAF Gold Cup players
2011 CONCACAF Gold Cup players
2013 CONCACAF Gold Cup players
2015 CONCACAF Gold Cup players
2017 CONCACAF Gold Cup players
VV De Valk players